Ronald Wayne Laws (born October 3, 1950) is an American jazz, jazz fusion and smooth jazz saxophonist, and singer. He is the younger brother of jazz flutist Hubert Laws, jazz vocalist Eloise Laws and the older brother of Debra Laws.

Biography
Born and raised in Houston, Texas, United States, Laws is the fifth of eight children. He started playing the saxophone at the age of 11.

He attended Stephen F. Austin State University in Nacogdoches, Texas, for two years.

In 1971, Laws journeyed to Los Angeles, California to embark upon a musical career. He started off by performing with trumpeter Hugh Masekela. In 1972, Laws joined the band Earth, Wind & Fire where he played saxophone and flute on their album Last Days and Time. After 18 months working with Earth, Wind and Fire, he decided to become a solo artist.  In 1975, Laws issued his debut album entitled Pressure Sensitive on Blue Note Records. The album reached No. 25 on the Billboard Top Soul Albums chart. In 1976, Laws went on to release his second LP Fever. The album reached No. 13 on the Billboard Top Soul LPs chart.

His third album, Friends & Strangers, was issued in 1977 on United Artists Records. The album has been certified gold in the US by the RIAA.
Laws' fourth studio LP, entitled Flame was released in September 1978 on United Artists. The LP reached No. 16 on the Billboard Top Soul Albums chart.

His follow up album Every Generation was issued in 1980 by United Artists Records. The album reached No. 4 on the Billboard Top Soul Albums chart.

Work with other artists
Laws produced and sang on Debra Laws' 1981 album Very Special. He later played saxophone on Ramsey Lewis' 1983 album Les Fleurs, Sister Sledge's 1983 LP Bet Cha Say That to All the Girls, Deniece Williams' 1984 album Let's Hear It for the Boy and Jeff Lorber's 1984 LP In the Heat of the Night. Laws also performed on Alphonse Mouzon's 1985 album The Sky Is the Limit and 1988 LP Early Spring. He later guested on Howard Hewett's 1988 LP Forever and Ever, Norman Brown's 1992 album Just Between Us and Earth, Wind & Fire's 1993 LP Millennium.

Laws has also worked with artists such as Guru, Brian Culbertson, Jeff Lorber and the Crusaders.

Legacy
Artists such as Boney James and Norman Brown have been influenced by Laws.

Discography

Albums

Charted singles

References

External links
Official website

Ronnie Laws Page by soulwalking.co.uk
Ronnie Laws interview for the WGBH series, Say Brother

1950 births
Living people
Musicians from Houston
American funk saxophonists
American male saxophonists
American jazz saxophonists
Earth, Wind & Fire members
20th-century American musicians
Stephen F. Austin State University alumni
21st-century American saxophonists
American male jazz musicians